Khachig Tölölyan (born 1944; Western ) is an Armenian-American scholar of diaspora studies.

Biography

Early life 
Tölölyan was born in 1944 in Aleppo, Syria to Minas Tölölyan and Kohar Tölölyan (née Chobanian), Armenian intellectuals and educators from Turkey. He grew up in the Armenian diaspora communities of the Middle East. The Tölölyans resided in Aleppo before relocating to Cairo, Egypt in 1956, and then Beirut, Lebanon in 1957. In 1960, they eventually moved to the US, settling in Watertown, Massachusetts.

Education 
Tölölyan graduated from Harvard University with a B.A. in Molecular Biology and later acquired an M.A. in English from the University of Rhode Island, an M.A.A. from Wesleyan University, and a PhD from Brown University in Comparative Literature.

Career 
Tölölyan was a Professor of English and Letters at Wesleyan University until his retirement in 2021. He is the founder of the academic journal Diaspora: A Journal of Transnational Studies, which has published articles by notable scholars such as Rey Chow, Vijay Mishra, and Lisa Lowe. The journal was initially published by Oxford University Press. Since 1996, it has been published by the University of Toronto Press. 

Tölölyan has also published articles on literature, including on the novelist Thomas Pynchon, terrorism, nationalism, diasporas, transnationalism, and globalization. He is considered a founder of the academic discipline of diaspora studies. Tölölyan is known for being an active member of the Armenian diaspora community and is the author of several hundred columns and articles in Armenian.

Publications
Tölölyan's most cited publications are:

References

Living people
Wesleyan University faculty
Wesleyan University alumni
Brown University alumni
University of Rhode Island alumni
Harvard College alumni
1944 births
American people of Armenian descent
Syrian people of Armenian descent
Scholars of diaspora studies